The Royal Hospital School (usually shortened as "RHS" and historically nicknamed "The Cradle of the Navy") is a British co-educational fee-charging boarding and day school with naval traditions. The school admits pupils from age 11 to 18 (Years 7 to 13) through Common Entrance or the school's own exam. The school is regulated by Acts of Parliament.

The school is located in the village of Holbrook, near Ipswich, Suffolk, England, United Kingdom.

The Royal Hospital School was established by a Royal Charter in 1712. It was originally located at Greenwich Hospital in Greenwich. The school moved in 1933 to East Anglia.

The school is the only UK independent boarding school to have ever been continuously granted the Queen's Banner and it flies its own Admiralty-approved Royal Hospital School Blue Ensign. It is one of only two UK schools whose students have the privilege of wearing Royal Navy uniforms, the other being Pangbourne College in Berkshire.

The school is affiliated to the Headmasters' and Headmistresses' Conference (HMC).

Bernard de Neumann notes the school's significance and impact in British history: "Just as, according to the Duke of Wellington, the Battle of Waterloo was won on the playing fields of Eton, it may justifiably be claimed, that the establishment of... the British Empire, was charted and plotted in the classroom of... the Royal Hospital School."

Overview
Seafaring traditions are important and integral elements of school life, and Royal Navy uniforms (sailor suits) are issued to all pupils and used for ceremonial and formal events. The school is owned by the Crown naval charity, Greenwich Hospital and as a result provides a number of means-tested bursaries for families with a seafaring background.

Leadership development is another distinctive feature of the Royal Hospital School derived from the naval background. Army, Royal Navy, Royal Air Force and Royal Marines Combined Cadet Force along with the Duke of Edinburgh's Award Scheme are the most popular extracurricular activities at the Royal Hospital School. The Combined Cadet Force also includes a Royal Electrical and Mechanical Engineers Section. HMS Illustrious is affiliated with the Royal Navy CCF. The Army Section is affiliated with Army Air Corps.

The Royal Hospital School has a partnership with America's second-oldest institution of higher education and "sister institution," The College of William and Mary in Virginia.

The Royal Hospital School is a boarding and day school with weekly boarding, three-night boarding, and 'flexi' or ad hoc boarding options.

Pupils
There are a little over 750 pupils at the school; of those, 330 are day pupils and 420 board on a full-time, weekly or 3-night basis. It is one of the largest boarding schools in East Anglia.

Boys and girls entering the school in year 7 (11+ years) join a Junior House, Blake, for one year. This provides a period of settling in and bridge from primary to senior school.

There are three boys' (Collingwood, Hawke and St Vincent) and three girls' (Anson, Hood and Howe) senior boarding houses, two co-educational day houses (Raleigh and Drake) and a boys' flexi-boarding and day house (Cornwallis).

In the final year (Year 13) boys and girls join Nelson House where more independent living provides a steppingstone to university or other life beyond school.

There are around 100 international students from about 30 countries. The school has specialist staff for international students and provides English as an Additional Language.

Academics
The school uses the National Curriculum Key Stages 3 (Years 7–9), 4 (Years 10–11), and 5 (Years 12–13), and provides a large choice of subjects for study. These include English, French, Spanish, Mandarin, German, physics, chemistry, biology, Latin, geography, history, mathematics, design technology, art, music, music technology, computing, physical education, media studies, business studies, psychology, sociology, drama and theatre, art history, government and politics, textiles, enterprise and entrepreneurship and religious studies.

History
The school was originally located at Greenwich Hospital and was based in what is now the National Maritime Museum in Greenwich, London. The Hospital was founded in 1694, and the school in 1712, both by Royal Charter. The original purpose of the school was to provide assistance and education to the orphans of seafarers in the Royal and Merchant Navies, and it was once the largest school for navigation and seamanship in the country.

The school has been located in Holbrook since 1933. The Holbrook campus was designed by the Birmingham-based arts and crafts architect Herbert Tudor Buckland and built by J. Gerrard & Sons Ltd of Swinton. Most of the buildings are now Grade II listed with the main range and chapel being Grade II*.

Until relatively recently, entry to the school was limited to the children or grandchildren of seafarers.  Until the 1950s, boys of the school were also required to join the Royal or Merchant Navies, and as such the education was focused on maritime matters. Although this requirement has not been in force for some decades, the school has retained certain naval traditions such as naval uniform, divisions (a formal parade and march past as practised in the armed forces) and an element of marching.

In 1991 the school became coeducational, with the girls first being introduced into Hood house, followed by Cornwallis, Howe and Blake (now co-educational) and Anson. Girls initially had a different naval uniform from boys, but this was changed to match the boys' uniform, and subsequently followed the changes in dress as seen in the Royal Navy. The first female Head of School was appointed in 1992 to work alongside the male Head of School.

In 1994 the entire school was bussed to Greenwich Hospital to parade in front of Queen Elizabeth II, in celebration of the tercentenary of the Hospital. The parade took place on the parade ground in front of the Queen's House. In 2012 the school marked three hundred years since its foundation with the opening of a Heritage Centre, publication of a commemorative book and a formal dinner in the Painted Hall at Greenwich.

In 2005 RHS was one of 50 of the country's leading independent schools which were found guilty of running an illegal price-fixing cartel which had allowed them to drive up fees for thousands of parents. Each school was required to pay a nominal penalty of £10,000 and all agreed to make ex-gratia payments totaling three million pounds into a trust designed to benefit pupils who attended the schools during the period in respect of which fee information was shared.

Greenwich Hospital

The school was founded by Royal Charter and is maintained by Greenwich Hospital. The hospital provides bursaries to a number of pupils. The school also awards academic, sports, music and sailing scholarships, as well as bursaries and discounts to the children of seafarers in the Royal Navy, Royal Marines or Merchant Navy.

Traditions

Many of the modern-day Royal Hospital School traditions are associated with the Royal Navy or seafaring. For example, key naval events are celebrated, the school has provision for sailing, and has a ceremonial guard and marching band.

Naval uniforms
As well as standard school uniform, both boys and girls wear Naval uniforms for ceremonial occasions such as "Divisions", a ceremony in which each house forms into two squads, Junior and Senior, and perform a march past on the parade square, with music played by the marching band and the Guard of Honour holding a key role. All house petty officers (POs) wear a chevron on their left arm. The school chiefs, approximately 20 Upper 6th Formers, wear chief petty officer ranks and uniform, including canes. The deputy heads of school (two boy and two girl prefects) carry the rank of warrant officer (second class). The heads of school (one boy and one girl prefect) carry the rank of warrant officer (first class).

Music
The Royal Hospital School has a distinctive musical tradition, with all pupils required to attend weekly congregation practice. The £3.6 million Reade Music School opened in 2008.

The Royal Hospital School marching band is a perennial part of school life. The band is managed by a former member of the Royal Marines Band Service, and the band's style is modelled on the Royal Marines. When the school forms up in divisions on the parade square, the band forms a separate division, larger than the others. It has travelled abroad for tours including to Sri Lanka and the USA. Some of the marches played include Heart of Oak, A Life on the Ocean Wave, "Holbrook March" and Royal Salute.

Band members were part of the orchestra for the premier performance of Benjamin Britten's Noye's Fludde on 18 June 1958 in Orford Church, Suffolk, as part of the Aldeburgh Festival, with the English Opera Group and a local cast.

The grand organ, a four-manual instrument, by William Hill & Son & Norman & Beard Ltd. was installed in the chapel in 1933.

School songs
"Go Forth With God" by Martin Shaw to the tune of Toc H.
"Eternal Father, Strong to Save"
"Holbrook" composed for the school by lifelong supporter Benjamin Britten
”Holbrook March” composed for the school by former Principal Director of Music Royal Marines, Lt Col Sir Vivian Dunn KCVO OBE FRSA Royal Marines
"Jerusalem"

Events

Burns Night
House Shout
Drama Festival
School Plays and Musicals
Music Recitals and Concerts
Christmas Dinner
Alumni Reunion including Sporting Events
Trafalgar Dinner
Speech Day
Remembrance Sunday
Leavers Ball

Chapel

The chapel programme is central to the RHS education. It is compulsory for pupils to attend a short service every morning before lessons from Tuesdays until Thursdays. Congregational practice is also held within the chapel every Saturday. A service is held every Sunday, also compulsory, with the exception of leave-out weekends. The mosaics in the apse are by Eric Newton, later to become art critic to The Guardian. The chapel is a Grade II* listed building.

Royal foundation
The Royal Hospital School has connections with the British Royal Family. These connections are principally The Royal Charter, School Visitor, and King's & Queen's Banners. The school's political breadth is shown by both its acknowledgement of its royal connections and its honouring the great republican hero, Robert Blake (admiral), after whom a House is named.

Many members of the Royal Family have involved themselves with the development of the school. Mary II's involvement with the Royal Hospital School is noted as "the darling object of her life".
 William III and Mary II – First Benefactors.
 Queen Anne – Donated confiscated properties of Captain Kidd.
 George II – presented assets from confiscated properties of the Earl of Derwentwater.
 George VI – Laid the foundation stone at Holbrook on 26 October 1928 (as the Duke of York).
 Queen Elizabeth The Queen Mother – presented the Royal Banner to the Royal Hospital School.

Houses
All 11 Houses at the Royal Hospital School are named in honour of a famous seafarer.

 St Vincent – boys' boarding Years 8–12, sky blue and pink
 Hawke – boys' boarding Years 8–12, white and navy
 Collingwood – boys' boarding Years 8–12, green and navy
 Drake – co-educational day Year 8–12, green
 Howe – girls' boarding Years 8–12, yellow
 Anson – girls' boarding Years 8–12, light blue and navy
 Hood – girls' boarding Years 8–12, yellow and navy
 Blake – co-educational boarding and day Year 7, red
 Raleigh – co-educational day Years 8–12, navy
 Cornwallis – boys' day with ad hoc boarding Years 8–12, red and navy
 Nelson – co-educational boarding and day Year 13

Sports
The school has inter-house sporting events and there are opportunities to enter inter-school competitions. Some school alumni have also gone on to be professional athletes.

The main sports at the school are as follows:

Michaelmas Term: Boys – rugby union and sailing, Girls – hockey and sailing
Lent Term: Boys – hockey, cross country, rugby 7s and sailing, Girls – netball, cross country and sailing
Summer Term: Boys – cricket, athletics, tennis and sailing, Girls – cricket, tennis, athletics and sailing
The school has 96 acres of sports fields, an all-weather pitch, tennis and netball courts, squash courts, a sports hall, fitness suite, strength and conditioning room, martial arts studio, climbing wall, indoor pool, golf course, nearby equestrian facilities (Bylam Livery Stables) and the majority of the sailing programme is delivered at Alton Water that neighbours the school.

Sailing is available to students all year round and the school takes pride in its rank as one of the best sailing schools in the country, with many students representing their nations at world sailing events. As well as the possibility to sail in school, a biennial sailing trip is offered to the school's sailors – the most recent trip having been Australia in 2017 and Greece in 2015.

Royal Hospital School Association
The Royal Hospital School Association is an association of former students and staff of the school.  Founded as the Greenwich Royal Hospital School Old Boys Association in 1925, it changed its name to the Royal Hospital School Association (RHSA) in 1992 in order to accommodate female ex-pupils. The Association publishes an irregular newsletter called Otia Tuta keeping members abreast of current events.

The Association holds an annual reunion at the school in June.

Notable former pupils

Sir Gilbert Thomas Carter (1848–1927), Administrator and Governor in Africa and the Caribbean
 Malcolm Cooper (1947–2001) – British marksman who won Olympic gold medals at Los Angeles and Seoul and beat or equalled 15 world records
 Professor Bernard de Neumann (1943–2018) – Mathematician
 John Deane (1800–1884) and Charles Deane – inventors of the diving helmet, and discoverers of the wreck of the Mary Rose in 1839, whilst clearing the wreck of the Royal George.
 Admiral Sir Philip King Enright, KBE, CB (1894–1960)
 Ernest Joyce, AM (1875–1940) – Antarctic Explorer, hero of the Ross Sea Party of Shackleton's ill-fated Imperial Trans-Antarctic Expedition.
 Rear-Admiral Stanley McArdle, GM (1922–2007)
 Admiral Arthur Phillip (1738–1814) – founder of Sydney, Australia and the Governor of the first European colony on the continent (NSW)
 Commander Harry Pursey MP (1891–1980) – Member of Parliament for Kingston upon Hull East 1945–70
 Peter Richards (1978–) -Rugby, England, Gloucester and London Irish.
 Duncan Scott-Ford (1921–1942) attended 1933–37. Youngest person to be executed under the Treachery Act 1940.
 Captain Thomas Henry Tizard (1839–1924) –  Oceanographer, Hydrographic surveyor and Navigator
 Don Topley (1964–)- Essex CCC and coach of Zimbabwe.
 Reece Topley (1994–), England cricketer
 Admiral Sir Henry Felix Woods, Pasha, (1843–1929) – Admiral in the Turkish Navy
 Hannah Stodel, (1985–), Paralympian

Notable staff
 Edward Riddle, FRAS (1786–1854), astronomer, mathematician and teacher of navigation. Highly esteemed teacher; senior mathematics master in the Upper School (1821–1840); headmaster of the Upper School (1840–1841); and then of the Nautical School (1841–1851).  Author of an authoritative and important book: "Treatise on Navigation and Nautical Astronomy", that was used throughout the world and ran to eight editions.  [1st edition 1821].
 The Revd George Fisher, FRS, FRAS (1794–1873) Astronomer, Arctic explorer.  Chaplain (1834–1863); Headmaster of the Upper School (1834–1840);  Principal of the schools (1860–1863).  Noted for his pioneering work in numerical educational attainment assessment.
 T/Sub-Lieut.John Herbert Babington, GC, OBE, Royal Naval Volunteer Reserve. Awarded George Cross for bomb disposal work 27 December 1940.  Headmaster 1951–1955.|Jj
 Andrew Doyle, Comedian and contributor to GB News.  English teacher and tutor in Collingwood House
 Simon Warr, television and radio presenter.  French and Latin master, also managed the school plays and Football and Rugby teams

See also
 Christ's Hospital
 Pangbourne College
 Welbeck College
 Eton College

References

Further reading
Desmond, Morris. "The Royal Hospital School Holbrook 1933–1993," United Kingdom.
McClean, David. "Education and Empire: Naval Tradition and England's Elite Society," British Academic Press, I. B. Tauris (15 January 1999), 
Newell, Phillip. "Greenwich Hospital: A Royal Foundation 1692–1983," United Kingdom.
 Turner, H.D. The Cradle of the Navy: The Story of the Royal Hospital School at Greenwich and at Holbrook, 1694–1988, William Sessions Limited of York, United Kingdom, 1990, 
 Waldie, Paul. "Ghosts and Kippers: Schoolboy Memories, from the Royal Hospital School, Greenwich," United Kingdom.

External links
 Official School Website
 Site for former pupils, parents etc
 The Royal Hospital School Association
 Profile on the Independent Schools Council website
 Greenwich Hospital site
 Holbrook Music Society site
 UK Boarding Schools Guide Profile

Boarding schools in Suffolk
College of William & Mary
Private schools in Suffolk
Military academies of the United Kingdom
Hospital School
Member schools of the Headmasters' and Headmistresses' Conference
1694 establishments in England
1712 establishments in England
Grade II* listed buildings in Suffolk
Grade II listed buildings in Suffolk
Grade II* listed educational buildings
Grade II listed educational buildings
Holbrook, Suffolk
History of the Royal Borough of Greenwich
Royal Navy
Military-related organizations
Military history of London
Royal Naval College, Greenwich
Naval museums in England
Maritime history of England
History of the Royal Navy

Blue Ensigns
Charities based in Suffolk
Educational institutions established in the 1690s
Schools with a royal charter
Military schools in the United Kingdom
Veterans' affairs in the United Kingdom